The Turkic Islamic Republic of East Turkestan (TIRET) was a short-lived breakaway Islamic republic founded on 12 November 1933. It was centred on the city of Kashgar in West of Xinjiang province (1912–1992)  in what is today a part of Xinjiang Uyghur Autonomous Region. Sometimes referred to simply as the East Turkestan Republic (ETR), it was primarily the product of an independence movement of the Uyghur population living there and more broadly of Turkic-ethnicity in character, including Kyrgyz and other Turkic peoples in its government and its population.

With the sacking of Kashgar in 1934 by Hui warlords nominally allied with the Kuomintang government in Nanjing, the first ETR was effectively eliminated. Its example, however, served to some extent as inspiration for the founding of a Soviet Second East Turkestan Republic (1944–1949) a decade later in North of the Xinjiang province and continues to influence modern Uyghur nationalist support for the creation of an independent East Turkestan.

Origins of the ETR Movement 

The stirrings of Uyghur separatism during the early 20th century were greatly influenced by the Turkish jadidist movement, which spread as wealthier Uyghurs, inspired by notions of Pan-Turkism, traveled abroad to Turkey, Europe, and Russia, and returned home determined to modernize and develop the educational system in Xinjiang. The first major school founded on the European model was located outside of Kashgar and, unlike the traditional curricula of the madrassah, focused on more technical areas of study such as science, mathematics, history, and language studies. Jadidism emphasized the power of education as a tool for personal and national self-advancement, a development sure to disturb the traditional status quo in Xinjiang. The ruler of Xinjiang, Governor Yang Zengxin (楊增新), responded by closing down or interfering with the operations of several of the new schools.

The birth of the Soviet Union influenced the Uyghurs, increasing the popularity of nationalist separatist movements and the spread of the communist message. A local Communist revolutionary organization was established in Xinjiang in 1921 (Revolutionary Uyghur Union, member of Comintern), the area also served as a refuge for many intellectuals fleeing the advent of Soviet Communism in Central Asia, which formed a division within the Xinjiang Turkic nationalist movement.

The situation in Xinjiang deteriorated with the assassination of Yang Zengxin in 1928 and the rise to power of his deputy, Jin Shuren (金樹仁), who declared himself governor after arresting and executing Yang's assassin, a rival official named Fan Yaonan (樊耀南) who had planned to assume the position for himself. Autocratic, corrupt, and ineffective at managing the province's development, Jin further antagonized the populace by reinstituting Sinicization policies, increasing taxes, prohibiting participation in the hajj and bringing in Han Chinese officials to replace local leaders.

Rebellion 

The situation came to a head in March 1930, when the Khan of Kumul Prefecture (Hami) or Kumul Khanate in Eastern Xinjiang, Shah Maqsud, died. In policies carried over from the Qing era, the Khan had been allowed to continue his hereditary rule over the area consistent with the principles of feudalism or satrapy. The importance of Hami territory, strategically located straddling the main road linking the province to Eastern China and rich in undeveloped farmland, together with a desire by the government to consolidate power and eliminate the old practice of indirect rule, led Jin to abolish the Khanate and assert direct rule upon Shah Maqsud's death.

Jin Shuren then proceeded to double agricultural taxes upon the local Uyghur population, expropriated choice farmland, and distributed it among Han Chinese refugees from neighboring Gansu province, subsidizing their efforts and resettling displaced Uyghurs on poor-quality land near the desert. The new garrison stationed in Hami proved even more antagonizing, and by 1931, scattered revolts, mobs, and resistance movements were emerging throughout the area. According to British missionaries Mildred Cable and Francesca French, who were resident in the Kumul area during and shortly after Jin's annexation of the Kumul Khanate, a rising against Jin Shuren was being systematically planned by prominent Kumulliks. Camels and mules were requisitioned to transport weapons, ammunition and stocks of food over little-known tracks to two former summer Khan's palaces in Aratam on the foot of Karlik Tagh Mountains and one at the natural fortress of Bardash set high in Karlik Tagh.   The final straw was in April 1931 when an ethnic Chinese officer and tax collector named Chang Mu wished to marry a Uyghur girl from a village Hsiao-Pu outside Hami.  Uyghur accounts usually claim that the girl was raped or the family coerced, but as Islamic law forbids Muslim girls to marry non-Muslim men it was clearly offensive to the Uyghur community.

Rebellion broke out on the night of April 4, 1931, with a massacre of Chang and his 32 soldiers at the wedding ceremony; 100 Han Chinese families of refugees from Gansu also were killed, altogether with Chinese garrisons in outposts at villages Tu-lu-Hu and Lao-mao-hu near Kumul. It was not confined to the ethnic Uyghur population alone; Kazaks, Kyrgyz, Han Chinese and Hui commanders all joined in revolt against Jin's rule, though they would occasionally break to fight one another.

The Soviet government further complicated the situation by dispatching troops to come to the aid of Jin and his military commander Sheng Shicai (盛世才), as did White Russian refugees from the Soviet Union living in the Ili River valley region.

The main fighting initially centered around Urumchi, which Hui forces laid under siege until Sheng Shicai's troops were reinforced by White Russian and Manchurian soldiers who had previously fled the Japanese invasion of northeast China. In April 1933, Jin was deposed by a combination of these forces and succeeded by Sheng, who enjoyed Soviet support. Newly bolstered, Sheng split the opposing forces around Urumchi by offering several Uyghur commanders (led by Khoja Niyaz Hajji, an advisor to the newly elected Kumul Khan Nazir (聶滋爾), the second son of recently deceased Kumul Khan Maqsud Shah, and to Nazir's eldest son and his designated heir Bashir (伯錫爾) with whom he studied together in religious school " Khanliq " in Kumul in their childhood) positions of power in Southern Xinjiang if they would agree to turn against the Hui armies in the north, led by Ma Zhongying (馬仲英).

Another Hui faction in Southern Xinjiang under command of Ma Zhancang (馬占倉), meanwhile, had struck an alliance with Uyghur forces located around Kucha under the leadership of Timur Beg, occupied Kucha without hostilities and proceeded to march towards Aksu, capturing the small town of Baicheng en route. On February 25, 1933 rebel forces entered Aksu Old City, shot all the Chinese residents and seized their property; it seemed probable that this was the work of Temur's men, as the Hui ( Tungan ) forces of Ma Zhancang are reported to have peacefully occupied Aksu New City, where they took possession of both the Arsenal and the Treasury, their contents were reportedly sent to Tungan Headquarters at Kara Shar. Later Ma Zhancang at the head of approximately 300 well-armed Tungan troops and Temur at the head of an estimated 4,700 ill-armed Uyghur irregulars resumed their advance on Maral Bashi and Kashgar. On April 13, 1933 Ma Shaowu (馬紹武), the Head of Chinese administration in Southern Xinjiang, ordered Chinese Brigadier Yang to leave Maral Bashi front and return to Kashgar with troops because of rapidly deteriorating  of the situation in Southern Xinjiang, that was not improved by the refusal of the British Indian Government to send troops to the assistance of the Chinese at Kashgar despite an official request made to the British Consul-General at Kashgar N.Fitzmaurice ( was in office from May 1922 to July 1922 and again from September 1931 to November 1933) by Ma Shaowu on February 25, 1933. It was all too apparent that no help would be forthcoming from Urumchi, after the cutting of telegraph links between Kashgar and Urumchi at Aksu. Brigadier Yang troops were attacked by Hui and Uyghur rebels on march and of his original force, estimated well over 1,000 troops, a mere sixty five had straggled back to Kashgar by April 27. Later the joint Uyghur and Hui force surrounding Kashgar split again, as Ma Zhancang allied with the local provincial authority representative, a fellow Hui named Ma Shaowu (馬紹武), and attacked the Uyghur forces, killing Timur Beg.

A Kirghiz rebellion had earlier broken out in Xinjiang in 1932, led by the Kirghiz leader Id Mirab. Ma Shaowu had crushed and defeated the Kirghiz rebels. The Soviet Union had been involved in also fighting against the rebels, who had spilled over to the Soviet side. In March 1932, large number of Kirghiz were driven across the Xinjiang frontier by pursuing Soviet forces. A series of guerrilla counter-attacks against the Soviets were mounted from Chinese territory and in raids on Koksu and two other Soviet posts a total of thirty seven Soviet troops were killed.

Establishment of the ETR 

The Eastern Turkistsan Independence Association in Kashghar ran a newspaper called Independence (Istqlāl).

While this was transpiring, in the nearby southern Tarim Basin city of Khotan, three brothers of rich Bughra family, Muhammad Amin Bughra, Abdullah Bughra and Nur Ahmad Jan Bughra, educated in the jadidist tradition, in February 1933 had led a rebellion of gold miners who worked in  Surghak mines near Keriya city, also in Yurunkash and Karakash mountain rivers, and established themselves as emirs of the city, having declared the Khotan Emirate and independence from China on March 16, 1933.

Leader of Karakash gold miners Ismail Khan Khoja sent message to Governor Jin Shuren: "Foolish infidels like you are not fit to rule. ... You infidels think that because you have rifles, guns ... and money, you can depend on them, but we depend of God in whose hands are our lives." 
Local provincial authorities and troops were annihilated by the miners throughout Khotan vilayet, rare Chinese population in most cases saved their lives and property, but was forced to accept Islam under the threat of execution. Old City of Khotan fell to rebels on February 28, 1933 with minimal resistance, the same day when rebels entered the city, while Khotan New City came under siege before surrendering on March 16, 266 Han soldiers of its garrison were spared and reportedly converted to Islam, while both the Treasury and Arsenal were captured by rebels, delivering to their hands several thousands of rifles and almost a ton of gold. The Khotan Emirate dispatched one of the three brothers, Shahmansur, known also as Emir Abdullah, and a former publisher named Sabit Damolla to Kashgar, where they established the Kashgar Affairs Office of the Khotan Government, led by Muhammad Amin Bughra, in July 1933. By the fall of that year, the office had shed many of its links to the Khotan government and reformed itself into the multi-ethnic, quasi-nationalist East Turkestan Independence Association, which drew heavily on ideas of Islamic reformism, nationalism and jadidism.

Tungans, Han, and Soviets were all viewed as enemies by the First East Turkestan Republic.

In November 1933, Sabit Damolla declared the establishment of the East Turkestan Republic with Hoja-Niyaz as its president — despite the fact that the respected commander was engaged in fighting in northern Xinjiang and had actually allied his forces with those of Sheng Shicai. Original proclamation was extremely anti-Tungan and anti-Han and contained such words:

The Tungans, more than Han, are the enemy of our people. Today our people are already free from the oppression of the Han, but still continue live under Tungan subjugation. We must still fear the Han, but cannot not fear the Tungans as well. The reason, we must be careful to guard against the Tungans, we must intensively oppose them, cannot afford to be polite, since the Tungans have compelled us to follow this way. Yellow Han people have not the slightest thing to do with Eastern Turkestan. Black Tungans also do not have this connection. Eastern Turkestan belongs to the people of Eastern Turkestan. There is no need for foreigners to come be our fathers and mothers. ... From now on we do not need to use foreigner's language or their names, their customs, habits, attitudes, written languages, etc. We must also overthrow and drive foreigners from our boundaries forever. The colours yellow and black are foul. ... They have dirtied our Land for too long. So now it's absolutely necessary to clean out this filth. Take down the yellow and black barbarians! Live long Eastern Turkestan!

Tungan, Dungan, and Hui all mean the same thing: Chinese speaking Muslims, Hui people.

On November 12, 1933, an independent republic (Turkish Islamic Republic of Eastern Turkestan (TIRET) or Republic of Uyghurstan, both names were used at the same time) was proclaimed. This event was organized on Sunday morning in a mass rally on the shore of Tuman River outside of Kashgar with the participation of about 7,000 troops and 13,000 civilians, including teachers and students of schools, who delivered speeches along with appointed "Ministers" of the independent republic. On noon cannon fired 41 times and crowd proceeded to the Old City of Kashgar, waving blue banners of Independence, where rally continued on the square in front of Idgah Mosque and more speeches were delivered from Mosque's front, where Sabit Damulla appeared as a main speaker.

Established distinct from the Khotan Emirate, the ETR claimed authority over territory stretching from Aksu along the northern rim of the Tarim Basin to Khotan in the south. Actually, Hoja Niyaz didn't join Republic in November 1933 and kept a separate administration in Aksu, that was involved in negotiations with USSR. In fact, the government in Kashgar was strapped for resources, plagued by rapid inflation, and surrounded by hostile powers — including the Hui forces under Ma Zhancang. Although established as a multiethnic republic, as reflected in the choice of the "East Turkestan" name used in its founding constitution, the first coins of the new government were initially minted under the name "Republic of Uyghurstan" (Uyghurstan Jumhuriyiti). In some sources, it is known as the "East Turkestan Islamic Republic", suggesting a greater role for Islam in its founding character. The extent of Islam's influence in the foundation of the ETR is disputed; while the constitution endorses sharia as the guiding law, the jadidist modernizing tradition places much greater emphases on reform and development, which is reflected in subsequent passages of the constitution that focus on health, education, and economic reforms. The Turkestan Declaration of Independence put political platform of the self-proclaimed Republic based on nine main principles:

 End the Chinese dictatorial rule in the Land of Eastern Turkestan.
 Establish a free and independent Eastern Turkestan Republic, based on equality of all nationalities.
 In order to fully develop the economy of Eastern Turkestan, promote industry, agriculture and animal husbandry as well as private businesses. Increase people's living standards.
 Since the majority of people of Eastern Turkestan believe in Islam, so the Government particularly advocates this religion. At the same time it promotes religious freedom for other religions.
 Develop education, culture and health standards in Eastern Turkestan.
 Establish friendly relations with all democratic countries in the World and neighbouring countries, especially with the United Kingdom, Soviet Russia, Turkey and China.
 In order to protect peace in Eastern Turkestan, recruit people of all nationalities to establish a strong Army.
 The Bank, Post Service, Telephone and Telegraph, Forestry and all underground wealth belong to the nation.
 Eliminate individualism, bureaucracy idea, nationalism and corruption among Government officials.

The efforts of the Turkish Islamic Republic of Eastern Turkestan to receive international recognition had failed despite the dispatching of numerous envoys by Prime Minister Sabit Damolla to the USSR (Tashkent, Moscow), Afghanistan, Iran, Turkey and India. The Soviet Union rejected all offers of dealing with Islamists. In Kabul, Kashgar representatives met the newly proclaimed King of Afghanistan Mohammad Zahir Shah and Prime Minister Sardar Mohammad Hashim Khan, asking for aid and a supply of arms. But both preferred to keep neutrality and not interfere in Chinese affairs. Other countries reacted the same way, refusing to recognize the envoys as representatives of an independent country. Although newly arrived at Kashgar in November 1933 British Consul-General Col.J.W.Thomson-Glover ( was in office from November 1933 to October 1936) was initially enthusiastic in his response to Sabit and Amirs and reported to New Delhi that  should any lasting unity between the Amirs and Khoja Niyas Hajji emerge, then with nominal allegiance to Nanjing it might be possible for a friendly power to extend practical sympathy and help to the new and struggling Republic, the Government of India lost no time in reminding Thomson-Glover that the British recognized Nanjing as the sole authority in Xinjiang and that all moves to counter Soviet penetration of the area should be based, as always, on a policy of support for the Chinese authorities in the province. The TIRET emissaries who reached New Delhi in February 1934 were similarly rebuffed, whilst The Times of London commented: So far as Delhi is concerned, the Republicans have gone to the wrong address. Xinjiang is the province of a State with which the British Government are on good terms and the delegates will get no more than the advice to settle their differences with Xinjiang before worse befalls them.  In Turkey the reports of developments in Xinjiang were initially greeted by the Turkish press which represented the Turkic-speaking rebels as True Turks and the TIRET as a modern state which will advance along the road to perfection. A New Year's telegram, which was sent by the TIRET to the Turkish Government at Ankara, conveying greetings from the Blue Flag of newly liberated Eastern Turkestan to the Red Flag of beloved Turkey  was widely circulated by the Anatolian News Agency, but no maternal support for the secessionists was forthcoming from Ankara and the Turkish Foreign Minister, Tawfiq Hushtu Bay, warned that nations who were neighbors of Soviet Russia must, above all, be on good terms with her.  None of the regional powers wanted to make a challenge to the Soviet Union and China in their politics and to become engaged in bloody fighting in Xinjiang, which had already claimed the lives of around 100,000 of its inhabitants. This left the fledgling Republic, which was surrounded on almost all sides by hostile powers (Tungans, Soviets, and Chinese), with very little chance to survive.

The Republic included the participation of Mahmud Muhiti, Yunus Beg and Maqsud Muhiti, a Jadidist. Shams al-Din Damulla was the Waqf affairs Minister while Agriculture Minister was Abuhasan, and Sabit Damulla was Prime Minister. Muhammad Amin Bughra, Shemsiddin Damolla, Abdukerimhan Mehsum, Sabit Damulla Abdulbaki, and Abdulqadir Damolla were all Jadists who took part in the First East Turkestan Republic.

Christians and Hindus 

Hostility to Christianity was espoused by the Committee for National Revolution. The Bughras applied Shari'a while ejecting the Khotan-based Swedish missionaries. They demanded the withdrawal of the Swedish missionaries while enacting Shariah on March 16, 1933. In the name of Islam, the Uyghur leader Amir Abdullah Bughra violently physically assaulted the Yarkand-based Swedish missionaries and would have executed them all, but they ended up only being banished thanks to the British interceding in their favor. There were beheadings and executions of Christians who had converted from Islam to Christianity at the hands of the Amir's followers. The missionaries faced hostility from the Uighur leader Muhammad Amin Bughra.

There were several hundred Uighur Muslims converted to Christianity by the Swedes. The Swedish Mission Society ran a printing operation. Life of East Turkestan was the state run media of the East Turkistan Republic. The Abdulbaqi lead government used the Swedish Mission Press to print and distribute the media. The Turkic Islamic Republic of East Turkistan's constitution mandated Islam as the official religion of the Republic, while guaranteeing religious freedom for all people.

The safety of the usurers and merchants of Hindu background from India were guaranteed by the British Consul-General. Russian refugees, missionaries, and Indian Hindu merchants and usurers were potential targets of gangs of Kashgaris so the Consulate-General of Britain was a potential shelter. Killings of 2 Hindus at the hands of Uighurs took place in Shamba Bazaar. They broke their feet, hands, teeth, stabbed their eyes, cut their tongues and ears. Plundering of the valuables of slaughtered Indian Hindus happened in Posgam on March 25 and on the previous day in Karghalik at the hands of Uighurs. Killings of Hindus took place in Khotan at the hands of the Bughra Amirs. Antagonism against the Hindus ran high among the Muslim Turki Uyghur rebels in Xinjiang's southern area. Muslims plundered the possessions in Karghalik of Rai Sahib Dip Chand, who was the aksakal of Britain, and his fellow Hindus on March 24, 1933, and in Keryia they slaughtered Indian Hindus. Sind's Shikarpur district was the origin of the Hindu diaspora there. The slaughter of the Hindus from India was called the "Karghalik Outrage". The Muslims had killed 9 of them. The forced removal of the Swedes was accompanied by slaughter of the Hindus in Khotan by the Islamic Turkic rebels. The Emirs of Khotan slaughtered the Hindus as they forced the Swedes out and declared Shariah in Khotan on March 16, 1933.

National army 

The National Army of the Islamic Republic East Turkestan Republic was formed on November 12, 1933, and originally consisted of two divisions (around 22,000 troops), the Qeshqer infantry division (stationed in the capital, Qeshqer), and the Khotan Infantry Division (stationed in Khotan). The National Army was poorly armed and trained in the beginning of the Revolution, so a military academy was set up in Atush (Artush) to train cadets. All Turkic ethnic groups were called to take up arms and join the National Army. The military was headed by the Defense Minister Mehmut Muhiti (a Uyghur revolutionary from Turpan). Although the true size of the National Army is not known, it is estimated at around 40,000 to 60,000 according to official Soviet sources.:

 Qeshqer infantry division
 Khotan infantry division
 Aksu cavalry brigade
 Qumul revolutionary regiment (later became a division)
 Turpan revolutionary brigade (later became the Turpan Division)
 Altay revolutionary cavalry brigade

During the war an estimated 300,000 to 500,000 Turki civilians were killed. Although it is not certain how many soldiers the IRET lost in the war, it is estimated that around 50,000 to 70,000 soldiers were killed. In some battles entire companies and brigades were wiped out. When IRET was dismantled in 1934 the army was dismantled also (except for 6th Uyghur Division personally commanded by Mehmut Muhiti).

End of the First East Turkestan Republic

In the north, aid came to Sheng Shicai's forces on January 24, 1934, in the form of two Soviet brigades, the Altaiskaya and Tarbaghataiskaya, disguised as "White Russian Cossack Altai Volunteer Army" and led by Red Army General Volgin (nickname of future Marshal Rybalko) in the Soviet Invasion of Xinjiang. The Japanese annexation of Manchuria and rumored support for Ma Zhongying's Hui forces were one cause for concern troubling Joseph Stalin, another was the prospect that rebellion in Xinjiang might spread to the Soviet Central Asian Republics and offer a haven to Turkic Muslim Basmachi rebels.  Trade ties between Xinjiang and the Soviet Union also gave the Soviets reason for supporting Sheng. Newly appointed Soviet Consul-General in Urumchi Garegin Apresov openly said to Sheng Shicai in May 1933 : You can develop the province and improve living conditions of the people of different nationalities, develop their culture. But if you let them ( muslim rebels ) to create an Independent State in the South of the province, converting it into the Second Manchuria at the back door of the USSR, we will not be just a side watchers, we will start to act. First request from Sheng Shicai of military support from USSR came in October 1933. In December 1933 Sheng Shicai arrested White Russian Colonel Papengut, who was staunchy anti-Soviet, and executed by demand of Apresov, replacing him by "neutral" General Bekteyev as Commander-in chief of three White Russian Regiments of Xinjiang Provincial Army, thus paving the way for Soviet intervention into Xinjiang.

Zhang Peiyuan, a Han Chinese General, who commanded Han Chinese troops in Ili, conducted negotiations with Ma Zhongying and planned to join him on the attack on Urumchi in January 1934. Initially Zhang seized the road between Tacheng and Ürümqi, but decided to return to Ghulja after receiving of message of capturing the city by Russian "Altai Volunteer Army", actually Soviet troops entered the city. Upon approaching Ghulja he was surrounded on mountain road, his troops were partly annihilated, partly fled to Muzart Pass on Tianshan Mountains and through it to Southern Xinjiang near Aksu. Zhang Peiyuan himself committed suicide. Ma Zhongying attacked Urumchi as was planned, taking Sheng completely by surprise, hiddenly approaching the city from the hills on the west and first capturing the telegraph station and aerodrom, then started besieging the city, completely isolating it from suburbs. But the fact, that in the crucial moment of besieging of Urumchi Ma Zhongying didn't receive the promised help from Zhang Peiyuan's Ili Army, was the reason of Ma's failure to capture the city in the first weeks of attack, nevertheless its fall was imminent and just a matter of time without intervention of Soviet troops. The battle for Urumchi was decisive for the whole Ma Zhongying's campaign in Xinjiang and its taking by his forces would lead to recognision of him The absolute ruler of Xinjiang by Nanjing Government of China, as was previously secretly promised to him.
The Soviet brigades, with air support, scattered Ma Zhongying's troops surrounding Ürümqi and forced them to retreat southward. On February 16, 1934, the siege of Urumchi was lifted, freeing Sheng, his Manchurian and the White Guard Russian Cossack troops, which had been trapped in the city by Ma forces since January 13, 1934.

Hoja-Niyaz Hajji had by this time arrived at Kashgar with 1,500 troops on the same day of January 13, 1934, to assume the presidency of the ETR, going against his previous deal with Sheng. With him arrived another prominent Uyghur leader from Eastern Sinkiang (Turpan, Kumul)  Mahmut Muhiti, known as Mahmut Sijan, i.e., division general, who had agreed to become Minister of Defense in the ETR Government, accepting the offer of Prime Minister Sabit Damolla. Sabit Damolla freed for Khoja Niyaz his own Palace in the old city of Kashgar, that was established in the former Yamen or residence of the head of Chinese administration of Southern Xinjiang, and asked to form a new Government. In his letter to Nanjing Central Government Khoja Niyaz explained his decision by emphasizing the fact, that he accepted the decision made by the Congress of People of Eastern Turkestan in accordance with its free will and choice and that Constitution of Chinese Republic of 1912 reserves the "right of five races of China to self-determination". He listed five principles of the self-ruling of the Republic:

 All of Xinjiang is part of the Eastern Turkestan Republic, while all, that do not belong, should go back to where they came from;
 The Government and economics will be conducted by the local people;
 All the oppressed people, now living in Eastern Turkestan, will have freedom to pursue education, commerce and to build a new nation;
 The President of the Republic, Khoja Niyaz, will build a Government dedicated to the happiness of the people;
 The Republic with its various departments will strive to catch up with other modernizing societies.

Khoja Niyaz introduced new state Flag of East Turkestan Republic, so called Kok Bayraq or Blue Banner, that resembled Turkish Flag but with blue background instead of red and substituted old flag, which was white with blue crescent and star and Shahada. Nevertheless, the ETR (TIRET) proved to be short-lived. The Hui forces retreating from the north linked up with Ma Zhancang's forces in Kashgar allied themselves with the Kuomintang in Nanjing, and attacked the TIRET, forcing Niyaz, Sabit Damolla, and the rest of the government to flee on February 6, 1934, to Yengi Hissar south of the city. The conquering Hui army killed many of those who remained, and a rapid procession of betrayals among the survivors, following their expulsion from Kashgar, spelled the effective end of the TIRET. The Hui army crushed the Uighur and Kirghiz armies of the East Turkestan Republic at the Battle of Kashgar (1934), Battle of Yarkand, and Battle of Yangi Hissar. Ma Zhongying effectively destroyed TIRET.

Mahmut Muhiti retreated with remainder of Army to Yarkand and Hotan, while  Hoja Niyaz Hajji fled through Artush to Irkeshtam on the Soviet/Chinese border, with Tungan troops on his heels, which chased him as far as the border. Hoja Niyaz took refuge in the USSR, where he was blamed by the Soviets for accepting from Sabit Damolla the position of first leader of TIRET (President), but was promised a military aid and "great prospects for the future" if he would help Sheng Shicai and the Soviets "to dissolve TIRET".

After signing the Document of TIRET dismissal and disbanding of most of its troops, that was applied to Khotanese and Kyrgyz troops (notification of concluded agreement with USSR on negotiations between Hoja Niyaz and Soviets in Irkeshtam on Soviet/Chinese border was received by TIRET cabinet and Prime-Minister Sabit Damulla in the city of Yengi Hisar on March 1, 1934; next day it was rejected by TIRET cabinet on the special meeting, which condemned the President as a "national traitor "; Sabit Damulla said on the meeting: Hoja Niyaz is not a Champion of Islam any more, he turned himself into a tool in the hands of Russians to subdue our country) Hoja Niyaz Hajji returned to Eastern Turkestan where he turned Sabit and several other TIRET ministers to Sheng, who rewarded him with control over southern Xinjiang as previously promised; those who escaped fled to India and Afghanistan.

The Kuomintang allied Hui forces under Ma Zhongying were defeated, and Sheng consolidated his rule over northern Xinjiang with Soviet backing. The seat of Hoja Niyaz Hajji Southern Xinjiang Autonomous Government was initially located in Aksu, but later he was urged by Sheng Shicai to move to Urumchi to assume the position of the Vice-Chairman of the Xinjiang Government. His forces received 15,000 rifles and ammunitions from the USSR, but each rifle, each bullet, and each bomb, that was dropped on Tungan troops from Soviet airplanes, had been bought in gold from the USSR by Hoja Niyaz Hajji.

New order was promulgated by Sheng Shicai's regime for the Xinjiang province, which China regarded as the "back door of China", but Stalin considered also to be the "back door of the USSR". This new order was to be executed through the two Programmes of the new Xinjiang Provincial Government, so called "Eight Points" and "Six Great Policies".

The Eight Points for Xinjiang were:
 Equality between races;
 Religious freedom;
 Immediate rural relief;
 Financial reforms;
 Administrative reforms;
 Extension of education;
 Realization of self-government;
 Judicial reforms.

These Eight Points for Xinjiang were symbolized by a new high medal of Xinjiang in the shape of an eight-point star, introduced by Provincial Government. Among first persons, who were awarded this medal, was Vice-Chairman of Xinjiang Government Khoja Niyaz (1934–1937) and Divisional General, Commander-in-Chief of 6th Uyghur Division, Deputy Chief of Kashgar Military Region Mahmut Muhiti (1934–1937).

The Six Great Policies for Xinjiang were:
 Anti-Imperialism;
 Kinship to the USSR;
 Racial and national equality;
 Clean Government and struggle against corruption;
 Maintaining of Peace;
 Reconstruction and building of a new Xinjiang.

These Six Great Policies for Xinjiang were symbolized by the introducing of a new flag of Xinjiang Province, that had six-point yellow star on red background and was in official use from 1934 to 1944 years.

 Battles in the Uighur War for Independence 
 Kizil massacre 
In the Kizil massacre in June 1933, Uighur and Kirghiz Turkic fighters broke their agreement not to attack a column of retreating Han Chinese and Chinese Muslim soldiers from Yarkand New City. The Turkic Muslim fighters massacred 800 Chinese Muslim and Chinese civilians.

 Battle of Aksu 
The Battle of Aksu on May 31, 1933 was a minor battle in which Chinese Muslim troops were expelled from the Aksu oases of Xinjiang by Uighurs led by Isma'il Beg when they rose up in revolt.

 Battle of Sekes Tash 
The Battle of Sekes Tash was a minor battle on September 7, 1933 when Chinese Muslim troops under general Ma Zhancang made a surprising sortie on the evening from Kashgar New City, attacked and inflicted a defeat upon Uighur and Kirghiz troops who were resting at village of  Sekes Tesh. About 200 Uighur and Kirghiz were killed, while Ma Zhancang troops returned in organized order to Kashgar New City.

 Battle of Kashgar (1933) 
In the Battle of Kashgar, Uighur and Kirghiz forces, led by the Bughra brothers and Tawfiq Bay, attempted to take the New City of Kashgar from Chinese Muslim troops under General Ma Zhancang.

Tawfiq Bey, a Syrian Arab traveler, who held the title Sayyid (descendant of the Islamic prophet Muhammad), arrived from Saudi-Arabia at Kashgar on August 26, 1933, and was shot in the stomach in September 1933. Previously Ma Zhancang arranged to have the Uighur Islamist leader Timur Beg killed and beheaded on August 9, 1933, displaying his head outside of Id Kah Mosque.
On August 28, 1933, representatives of Khoja Niyas Hajji, who were bitterly anti-Tungan, but conciliatory towards the Han Chinese, arrived at Kashgar Old City and conveyed message from Khoja Niyas to all rebel forces in the  Kashgar Old City that New City of Kashgar, with its important Arsenal and Treasury, should be captured from Ma Zhancang's Tungan forces as swiftly as possible. As result, attacks on the besieged Ma Zhancang's garrison were resumed by the former Timur Beg's troops, now being reorganized under command of Tawfiq Bey, and by Kirghiz troops under command of Osman Ali.

Chinese troops commanded by Brigadier Yang were absorbed into Ma Zhancang's army. A number of officers were spotted wearing the green uniforms of Ma Zhancang's unit of the 36th division, presumably they had converted to Islam.

During the battle the Kirghiz prevented the Uyghur from looting the city of Kashgar, because they wanted to loot it themselves. They started murdering any Chinese and Chinese Muslims they could get their hands on, as well as any Turkic people who were wives or mistresses of Chinese. They then looted their property.

 Further uprisings 
In Charchan, Uighurs revolted against Chinese Muslim forces, the emirs of Khotan sent 100 troops to defend Charchan from Kara Shahr Chinese Muslims who controlled Charkhlik. By 11 April 1933, Guma, Karghalik, Posgam, and the Old City in Yarkand fell to Uyghur rebels.

 Battle of Toksun 
The Battle of Toksun occurred in July 1933 after Khoja Niyas Hajji, a Uighur leader, defected with his forces to Governor Sheng Shicai. He was appointed by Sheng Shicai through Agreement ( signed in 10 articles on June 4, 1933, in Jimsar between Sheng Shicai and Khoja Niyas under mediation of Soviet Consul in Urumchi, both sides agreed to turn their forces against  General Ma Chung-yin and his Tungans) to be in charge for the whole Southern Xinjiang (Tarim Basin) and also Turpan Basin and Kumul and being satisfied with this agreement he marched away from Ürümqi to the South across Dawan Ch'eng of Tengritagh Mountains. Here he occupied Toksun in Turpan Basin, but was badly defeated by the Chinese Muslim forces of General Ma Shih-min, who forced him to retreat to Karashar in Eastern Kashgaria, where he held his headquarters during July, August and September 1933, defending mountain passes and roads, that led from Turpan Basin to Kashgaria, in the fruitless attempt to stop advancement of Tungan Armies to the South.

 Battle of Kashgar (1934) 
In the 1934 Battle of Kashgar, 36th division General Ma Fuyuan led a Chinese Muslim army to storm Kashgar on February 6, 1934, and attacked the Uighur and Kirghiz rebels of the First East Turkestan Republic. He freed another 36th division general, Ma Zhancang, who was trapped with his Chinese Muslim and Han Chinese troops in Kashgar New City by the Uighurs and Kirghizs since May 22, 1933, and was involved in continuous fighting, that lasted for more than five and half months, for holding control of a New City with its important Arsenal and Treasury since August 15, 1933.  In January, 1934, Ma Zhancang's Chinese Muslim troops repulsed six Uighur attacks launched by Khoja Niyaz, who arrived at the city on January 13, 1934, with 1,500 troops, inflicting massive casualties on the Uighur forces. From 2,000 to 8,000 Uighur civilians in Kashgar Old City were massacred by Tungans in February, 1934, in revenge for the Kizil massacre, after retreating of Uighur forces from the city in four directions: to Yengi Hisar with the Government, to Yarkand, to Upal and to Artush. The Chinese Muslim and 36th division Chief General Ma Zhongying, who arrived at Kashgar on April 7, 1934, gave a speech at Idgah mosque in April, reminding the Uighurs to be loyal to the Republic of China government at Nanjing. Several British citizens at the British consulate were murdered by troops of the 36th division.

 Battle of Yangi Hissar 

In the Battle of Yangi Hissar, Ma Zhancang led the 36th division to attack Uighur forces at Yangi Hissar, wiping out the entire Uighur force, and killing the Emir Nur Ahmad Jan Bughra. The siege on Yangi Hissar citadel continued almost half a month, during which 500 Uyghur defenders, armed only with rifles, inflicted heavy casualties, up to several hundreds, to Tungan forces, who contrary were armed with artillery cannons and machine guns, besides of rifles. Quickly running out of ammunition Uyghur defenders applied tree trunks, large stones and oil fire bombs for defending of the citadel. On March 26, 1934, Nur Ahmad Jan Bughra ordered troops in citadel  to stop fighting to celebrate Holy Day of Kurban Bayram (Feast of Sacrifice), but on the same day Chinese Muslims managed to breach through the walls of citadel by successful mining and put to death all remaining defenders by sword. It was reported by Ahmad Kamal in his book Land Without Laughter on pages 130–131, that Nur Ahmad Jan's head was cut off by the Chinese Muslim troops and sent to the local parade ground to be used as a ball in the soccer (football) game.

 Battle of Yarkand 
In the Battle of Yarkand in March–April 1934, Ma Zhancang and Ma Fuyuan's Chinese Muslim troops, 10,000 strong, defeated 2,500 strong Uighur force led by emir Shah Mansur (Abdullah Khan Bughra) from Yarkand to Yengi Hissar to deblocade citadel in which his brother Nur Ahmad Jan Bughra was besieged. This force included a small number of Afghan volunteers sent by king Mohammed Zahir Shah and who served as body guards of emir Abdullah. For two weeks of fierce fighting by March 28, 1934, of 2,500 emir Abdullah soldiers, who initially were engaged in the battle, 2,300 had been killed or wounded. The last engagement occurred near Sweden mission in Yarkand during which the emir Abdullah Bughra was allegedly killed and beheaded, his head put on display at Idgah mosque. None of 24 Afghan body guards left Shah Mansur till last minute and all were killed in the battle.

 Charkhlik Revolt 
The 36th division under General Ma Hushan crushed the Charkhlik Revolt by the Uighurs in the Charkliq oasis in 1935. More than 100 Uighurs were executed, and the family of the Uighur leader was taken as hostage.

Aftermath
By the end of 1934, Sheng Shicai, with Soviet backing, was firmly in control of Xinjiang.  With Soviet mediation, Khoja Niyaz agreed to serve as the vice chairman of the Xinjiang Government led by Sheng.  Sheng appointed Mahmut Muhiti as the deputy military commander of the Kashgar region, and permitted Yulbars Khan, one of the Hami rebel leaders, to serve as the head of Hami County.  Ma Zhongying was persuaded to study in the Soviet Union, where he disappeared.  His subordinate forces in southern Xinjiang were eventually absorbed by Sheng Shicai.  Muhammad Amin Bughra fled to Afghanistan where he sought Japanese support for the ETR.

In 1937, Mahmut Muhiti and Ma Hushan, Ma Zhongying's former subordinate, launched a rebellion in southern Xinjiang against Sheng.  The rebellion was crushed by Sheng with Soviet support. Mahmut Muhiti and Ma Hushan fled to British India.  Mahmut Muhiti eventually collaborated with Japan and died in Japanese-occupied Beiping in 1944.  Ma Hushan joined Qinghai warlord Ma Bufang.

On account of Khoja Niyaz's associate Mahmut Muhiti, Sheng had Khoja Niyaz arrested for allegedly being "counter-revolutionary Trotskyst" and "Japanese agent".  Khoja Niyaz was eventually executed in prison.  In 1937, Sheng also attacked Hami, forcing Yulbars Khan to flee to the Nationalist Chinese government led by Chiang Kai-shek in Nanjing.

Interviews with Turkistani veterans in exile suggest that Sheng Shicai and the Soviets collaborated to crush the Republic. Russia had a two-sided policy in relation to the region of East Turkestan; often promising aid (in 1933 and 1944) but placing its own political and economic interests above everything else. The Soviet Union did not offer any military equipment despite being paid for it by a delegation of the Republic.

In 1944, after Sheng switched his allegiance from the Soviet Union to the Nationalist Chinese regime, the Soviet Union responded by supporting a rebellion in Ili, which led to the creation of the Second East Turkestan Republic by Soviet trained Turkic-leaders.  Sheng was forced to leave Xinjiang and accept a position with the Nationalist Chinese government in Chongqing. After heavy fighting between the Second ETR regime, which enjoyed Soviet military backing, and the Nationalist Chinese forces in Xinjiang, which were supplemented by the forces of the Hui warlord Ma Bufang in 1944–45, the Republic of China and Soviet Union reached an understanding, under which the Ili rebels agreed to dissolve the Second ETR and join a coalition provincial government with the Chinese Nationalists. The Ili rebels retained their autonomy and allegiance to the Soviet Union.

Muhammad Amin Bughra was appointed by Nationalist Chinese leader Chiang Kai-shek to serve as the vice chairman of the coalition government in the end of 1948. Yulbars Khan  was restored to a military leadership position in Hami by the Nationalists.  Muhammad Amin Bughra, though a veteran leader of the First ETR, was a Nationalist supporter who declared alliance with Nationalist Chinese against the Soviet-backed Ili rebels of the Second ETR in Xinjiang.

In 1949, the Xinjiang coalition government was ended by the Chinese Communists who had defeated the Chinese Nationalists in the Chinese Civil War and incorporated Xinjiang into the People's Republic of China with the support of the Soviet Union.  Muhammad Amin Bughra fled to exile in Turkey.  Yulbars Khan fled to Nationalist Taiwan.  Ma Hushan was captured and executed by the Chinese Communists.

Gallery

 See also 
 Second East Turkestan Republic
 East Turkestan independence movement
 History of Xinjiang
 East Turkestan Government-in-Exile

 References 
 Citations 

 Sources 

 James A. Millward and Nabijan Tursun, "Political History and Strategies of Control, 1884–1978" in Xinjiang: China's Muslim Borderland.
 Michael Zrazhevsky, "Russian Cossacks in Sinkiang". Almanach "The Third Rome", Russia, Moscow, 2001
 Sven Hedin, "The flight of Big Horse". New York, 1936.
 Burhan Shahidi (包尔汗), 《新疆五十年》 [Fifty Years in Xinjiang], (Beijing, Wenshi ziliao, 1984).
 Clubb, O. E., China and Russia: The "Great Game". (NY, Columbia, 1971).
 Forbes, A. D. W. Warlords and Muslims in Chinese Central Asia: A Political History of Republic Sinkiang, 1911–1949 (Cambridge, England: Cambridge University Press, 1986).
 Hasiotis, A. C. Jr. Soviet Political, Economic and Military Involvement in Sinkiang from 1928 to 1949 (NY, Garland, 1987).
 Khakimbaev A. A., "Nekotorye Osobennosti Natsional’no-Osvoboditel’nogo Dvizheniya Narodov Sin’tszyana v 30-kh i 40-kh godakh XX veka" [Some Characters of the National-Liberation Movement of the Xinjiang Peoples in 1930s and 1940s], in Materialy Mezhdunarodnoi Konferentsii po Problemam Istorii Kitaya v Noveishchee Vremya, Aprel’ 1977, Problemy Kitaya (Moscow, 1978) pp. 113–118.
 Lattimore, O., Pivot of Asia: Sinkiang and the Inner Asian Frontiers of China (Boston, Little, Brown & Co., 1950).
 Rakhimov, T. R. "Mesto Bostochno-Turkestanskoi Respubliki (VTR) v Natsional’no-Osvoboditel’noi Bor’be Narodov Kitaya" [Role of the Eastern Turkestan Republic (ETR) in the National Liberation Struggle of the Peoples in China], A paper presented at 2-ya Nauchnaya Konferentsiya  po Problemam Istorii Kitaya v Noveishchee Vremya, (Moscow, 1977), pp. 68–70.
 Wang, D., "The USSR and the Establishment of the Eastern Turkestan Republic in Xinjiang", Journal of Institute of Modern History, Academia Sinica, Taipei, vol. 25 (1996) pp. 337–378.
 Whiting, A. S., and Sheng Shih-ts’ai, Sinkiang: Pawn or Pivot?'' (Michigan, East Lansing, 1958).

East Turkestan independence movement
Former countries in Chinese history
Former republics
20th century in Xinjiang
States and territories established in 1933
1933 establishments in China
1934 disestablishments in China
Former countries of the interwar period